King Edward VIII was the King of the United Kingdom and the Dominions and colonies of the British Commonwealth, Emperor of India, from 20 January to 11 December 1936, when he abdicated the throne.
 
During his reign Edward was served by eight prime ministers; one each from the United Kingdom, Australia, Canada, the Irish Free State, New Zealand, Northern Ireland, South Africa, and Southern Rhodesia. Edward's short reign saw no changes in the occupancy of any these offices.

Prime ministers

References

See also
British Empire
Constitutional monarchy
Commonwealth of Nations

British Empire-related lists
Commonwealth realms
Edward VIII, Prime Ministers
Edward VIII
Edward VIII